Doubting Thomas is a 1935 American comedy film directed by David Butler and written by William Conselman and Bartlett Cormack. It is based on the 1922 play The Torch Bearers by George Kelly. The film stars Will Rogers, Billie Burke, Alison Skipworth, Sterling Holloway, Andrew Tombes and Gail Patrick. The film was released on June 7, 1935, by 20th Century-Fox Film Corporation.

Plot
A husband makes fun of his wife's theatrical aspirations when she agrees to appear in a local production. When she begins to neglect him, he decides to retaliate by also going on stage.

Cast
Will Rogers as Thomas Brown
Billie Burke as Paula Brown
Alison Skipworth as Mrs. Pampinelli
Sterling Holloway as Mr. Spindler
Andrew Tombes as Huxley Hossefrosse
Gail Patrick as Florence McCrickett
Frances Grant as Peggy Burns
Frank Albertson as Jimmy Brown
Johnny Arthur as Ralph Twiller
Helen Flint as Nelly Fell
Fred Wallace as Teddy
T. Roy Barnes as LaMaze
Ruth Warren as Jenny
John Qualen as Von Blitzen
George Cooper as Stagehand
Helen Freeman as Mrs. Sheppard
William "Billy" Benedict as Caddie
Dennis O'Keefe as Audience Member (uncredited)

References

External links
 
 
 

1935 films
1930s English-language films
Fox Film films
American comedy films
1935 comedy films
Films directed by David Butler
American black-and-white films
American films based on plays
Films based on works by American writers
1930s American films